Revaz Nadareishvili (born June 21, 1991) is a Georgian Greco-Roman wrestler. He won a bronze medal at the 2017 World Wrestling Championships. He competed in the men's Greco-Roman 98 kg event at the 2016 Summer Olympics, in which he was eliminated in the round of 16 by Elis Guri.

In 2022, he competed in the 97 kg event at the European Wrestling Championships in Budapest, Hungary where he was eliminated in his first match.

References

External links
 

1991 births
Living people
Male sport wrestlers from Georgia (country)
Olympic wrestlers of Georgia (country)
Wrestlers at the 2016 Summer Olympics
Wrestlers at the 2019 European Games
European Games competitors for Georgia (country)
World Wrestling Championships medalists
20th-century people from Georgia (country)
21st-century people from Georgia (country)